Charlotte Clippers may refer to

Charlotte Clippers (EHL), later the Charlotte Checkers, a team in the Eastern Hockey League from 1956 to 1977
Charlotte Clippers (1941–1949), an American football team originally in the Dixie League